Rasmus Leislahti (born 16 June 2000) is a Finnish professional footballer, who plays as a goalkeeper for Finnish premier division club Ilves.

References 

2000 births
Living people
Finnish footballers
Finland youth international footballers
Finland under-21 international footballers
Association football goalkeepers
Klubi 04 players
FC Honka players
Pallohonka players
Vaasan Palloseura players
Vasa IFK players
FC Ilves players
Ykkönen players
Kakkonen players
Veikkausliiga players